The bailli, bailie, or bailiff was the administrative representative of the Princes of Achaea, ruling the Principality of Achaea in the Prince's absence. The early princes, who belonged to the founding Villehardouin dynasty, resided in the principality, and governed it directly. In 1278, Achaea passed to Charles of Anjou, the King of Naples. Charles, and many of his successors, ruled the principality through their baillis, and never visited it in person. Originally, the baillis were Angevin officials, but the post was often given to powerful feudatories from Achaea and the rest of Frankish Greece.

The administration of other Angevin possessions in Greece, such as Lepanto and the County palatine of Cephalonia and Zakynthos, was also united in the hands of the bailli of Achaea.

List of baillis

References

Sources
 
 
 
  
 
 
 

 
Lists of governors